Troughton's sheath-tailed bat (Taphozous troughtoni) is a species of sheathtail bat in the family Emballonuridae, found only in Australia.

References

Bats of Australia
Least concern biota of Queensland
Mammals of Queensland
Nature Conservation Act endangered biota
Taphozous
Mammals described in 1952
Taxonomy articles created by Polbot
Taxa named by George Henry Hamilton Tate